MrBeast Burger is an American virtual restaurant founded and developed by internet personality Jimmy Donaldson (MrBeast), in partnership with Virtual Dining Concepts, LLC. There are virtual locations in North America and Europe, with plans to expand to more countries and increase the number of locations exponentially.

The chains feature a menu consisting of various burgers, french fries, desserts, and canned beverages. Customers order food from a delivery app, which in turn is prepared at the brick-and-mortar locations of contracted restaurants.

History

Pre-release 

Although it is unclear when Donaldson began working on MrBeast Burger, he said on his Twitter account that he had been planning on the release "for forever". Will Hyde, a manager for Donaldson's YouTube channel, said that the project had been in the works for several months, while Reed Duchscher, another manager, stated that it had been planned for over a year. The official Twitter account for MrBeast Burger was created on August 12, 2020, and locations began appearing to users on delivery apps days before the official release.

Official opening
The first MrBeast Burger location officially opened on November 10, 2020, in Wilson, North Carolina. This location, which was a temporarily-redecorated Burger Boy restaurant, was the only physical location of the store. As part of a YouTube video, Donaldson advertised free food and gave away money, technology, and even a new car to patrons who lined up in the building's drive-through. The event attracted thousands of customers, with the line reaching as far as 20 miles at times.

Although police worked to control traffic, the line eventually became too long to handle and, at the request of the police department, the line was closed. Donaldson uploaded a video of this event to his YouTube channel on December 19, 2020, where he officially announced the chain's opening with pop-up and contracted 300 locations across the United States. Donaldson also announced that a portion of each order would be donated to charities helping to ensure food security worldwide.

MrBeast Burger rapidly rose to popularity after it was announced. Shortly after the video was uploaded, it reached the #1 trending spot on YouTube, and the corresponding MrBeast Burger apps rose to the top spot on the Apple App Store and Google Play Store. The apps were downloaded at such a rate that servers became overwhelmed, causing temporary service outages for some users. The issue was fixed shortly thereafter. Due to its surge in popularity, almost all of the pop-up and contracted 300 locations reported running out of food on the first night.

Three months after its opening, MrBeast Burger passed 1 million burgers sold.

On April 26, 2021, MrBeast Burger announced a partnership with YouTuber Dream involving the introduction of a new limited-time Dream Burger featuring two smashed beef patties, American cheese, lettuce, mayo, bacon, two pickles, and smashed avocado.

On March 18, 2022, Donaldson uploaded a video on his MrBeast 2 channel, titled "I Made 100 People Try This!". It featured the release of the newest item on the MrBeast Burger menu, the Shrek Quesadilla. Universal Studios had allowed him to license the Shrek IP. The quesadilla consists of two beef patties, cheese, pickles, and onions.

Expansion 
Since its initial opening, plans for the expansion of MrBeast Burger locations have been announced.  Following complaints from fans who did not live in areas served by delivery, Donaldson acknowledged the issue and stated that efforts were underway to double and triple the number of locations.

The first locations in Canada were opened in early February, with locations in Toronto, Edmonton, Calgary, with additional locations opening shortly after in Vancouver, Halifax and in Winnipeg. The first locations in the United Kingdom (UK) opened in early May, with five locations.

On August 30, 2022, Donaldson announced that he would bring a MrBeast Burger shop to the American Dream Mall in East Rutherford, New Jersey, near New York City, to be the location of his first U.S. restaurant. The restaurant then proceeded to open on September 4, 2022, where thousands of patrons flooded the mall so much so that New Jersey state troopers were called in to control the crowd situation.

MrBeast Burger has over 300 virtual locations across the US mainland, and a location in Puerto Rico.

Reception

Quality concerns 
Upon opening, MrBeast Burger received mixed reviews. Many customers shared their opinions on Twitter, with some praising the chain while others complained of poor service, long wait times, and an unappealing presentation.  Additionally, accusations surfaced that chains were serving raw food. YouTubers Josh Carrott and Ollie Kendal tasted the takeaway menu on their channel "Jolly"; one hamburger was shown served on a moldy bun.

Although many customers tried to contact Donaldson to express their complaints directly, others came to Donaldson's defense and redirected the blame to the restaurants preparing the orders. Because the chain is operated as a ghost kitchen, the orders are cooked by staff of the contracted restaurant, hence the quality of an order can be dependent on the location it was ordered from.

Donaldson addressed the complaints on Twitter, stating, "I’ll be the first to admit we are not perfect!...[S]ome people had problems and I will gladly refund them and do what I have to to make it right!"

Benefit to struggling restaurants 
MrBeast Burger became a second source of revenue for struggling restaurants during the COVID-19 pandemic. The chain featured a menu that easily suits many restaurant kitchens without the need for new equipment or training. One location outside Dallas reported earning over $7,000 on their first day open. Most of the restaurants which MrBeast Burger operates from are Buca di Beppos, Bertucci's, and Bravo! Italian Kitchens, but other restaurants can also apply to become a MrBeast Burger location.

See also
 List of hamburger restaurants

References 

Hamburgers (food)
Restaurant chains in the United States
American companies established in 2020
2020 establishments in North Carolina